E121 may refer to:
 European route E121
 Citrus Red 2, a food dye, sometimes used in the United States to color the skin of oranges
 Unbiunium, a hypothetical element